The South African Heavyweight Title is an inactive professional wrestling championship that was once competed for in the now-defunct  South African professional wrestling promotion Interworld Wrestling Promotions, contested exclusively among Heavyweight wrestlers. It was created in 1950 and the first champion was Willie Liebenberg. The last champion to win it was Danie Voges, who subsequently retired the belt in 1990.

Title history

See also
CWA World Heavyweight Championship
EWU World Super Heavyweight Championship

References

External links
Pro Wrestling Title History

Heavyweight wrestling championships
National professional wrestling championships
Professional wrestling in South Africa